Mitogen-activated protein kinase 11 is an enzyme that in humans is encoded by the MAPK11 gene.

Function 

The protein encoded by this gene is a member of the MAP kinase family. MAP kinases act as an integration point for multiple biochemical signals, and are involved in a wide variety of cellular processes such as proliferation, differentiation, transcription regulation, and development. This kinase is most closely related to p38 MAP kinase, both of which can be activated by proinflammatory cytokines and environmental stress. This kinase is activated through its phosphorylation by MAP kinase kinases (MKKs), preferably by MKK6. Transcription factor ATF2/CREB2 has been shown to be a substrate of this kinase.

Interactions 

MAPK11 has been shown to interact with HDAC3 and Promyelocytic leukemia protein.

See also 
 p38 mitogen-activated protein kinases

References

External links 
 MAP Kinase Resource  .

Further reading 

 
 
 
 
 
 
 
 
 
 
 
 
 
 
 
 
 
 

EC 2.7.11